Ravanelli Ferreira dos Santos (born 29 August 1997) is a Brazilian footballer who plays as an attacking midfielder or a second striker for Cianorte.

Club career

Akhmat Grozny
On 20 June 2017, he signed a 4-year contract with the Russian Premier League club FC Akhmat Grozny.

Athletico Paranaense
On 12 August 2020, he joined Athletico Paranaense on loan until February 2021, with a purchase option.

Chapecoense
On 25 March 2021, he was loaned to Chapecoense until the end of 2021.

São Bernardo
On 20 January 2022, Akhmat announced Ravanelli's transfer to São Bernardo on a permanent basis. Akhmat retained 70% of the fee for his next transfer.

Career statistics

References

External links

1997 births
Sportspeople from Campinas
Living people
Brazilian footballers
Brazil under-20 international footballers
Association football midfielders
Associação Atlética Ponte Preta players
FC Akhmat Grozny players
Club Athletico Paranaense players
Associação Chapecoense de Futebol players
São Bernardo Futebol Clube players
Cianorte Futebol Clube players
Campeonato Brasileiro Série A players
Russian Premier League players
Campeonato Catarinense players
Campeonato Paranaense players
Brazilian expatriate footballers
Expatriate footballers in Russia
Brazilian expatriate sportspeople in Russia